Rud Posht (also Romanized as Rūd Posht) is a village in Esfivard-e Shurab Rural District, in the Central District of Sari County, Mazandaran Province, Iran. At the 2016 census, its population was 1500, in 330 families.

References 

Populated places in Sari County